The following is a list of Major League Baseball players, retired or active.

Ti through Ty

References

External links
Last Names starting with Ti through Ty – Baseball-Reference.com

 Ti-Tz